Brigitte François-Sappey (born 21 January 1944) is a French musicologist, educator, radio producer, and lecturer.

Biography 
Brigitte François-Sappey studied music at the Conservatoire de Paris where she won first prizes of music history, musical analysis, musical esthetics, musicology, and at the École normale de musique de Paris where she graduated for piano teaching.

At the same time, she pursued graduate studies in history at the Paris IV University. After obtaining a bachelor's and master's degrees, she is a Ph.D. student in humanities and social sciences, under the direction of Norbert Dufourcq.

A professor of music history at the Conservatoire de Paris from 1973, she created the class of music culture in 1992, of which she is now an honorary professor. She also founded the classes of art and civilization and history of music at the Conservatoire de Lyon (1979–1982) and musical analysis at the Conservatoire Rameau of the 6th arrondissement of Paris (1976–1979). She has been a visiting professor at the University of Lisbon (1978), the summer university of Versailles (1979–1982) and at the University of Paris III: Sorbonne Nouvelle (2003–2009).

She is a member of numerous juries in superior conservatories, the École normale supérieure and several universities, including Paris-Sorbonne.

A producer of concerts and programs at Radio France (1991–1997), she has since been invited at France Musique, France Culture, as well as Radio Suisse Romande.

She regularly participates in scientific conferences and gives numerous lectures in very different places (universities, La Folle Journée of Nantes etc.).

Brigitte François-Sappey is chevalier of the Légion d'honneur, and officier of the Ordre des Arts et Lettres.

Publications 

In addition to numerous articles and contributions to collective works, her main works deal with French and German romanticism.

 Pierre Baillot  (Picard, 1978),
 Jean-François Dandrieu (Picard, 1982) ,
 Alexandre Pierre François Boëly et son temps (Aux Amateurs de livres, 1989) ,
 Le Personnel de la Musique royale (1774–1792) (Picard, 1990, 1992),
 Guide de la musique d'orgue, in collaboration with Gilles Cantagrel (Fayard, 1991),
 Charles-Valentin Alkan, direction of the work (Fayard, 1991) ,
 Histoire de la musique en Europe (PUF, 1992), Translated into several languages
 Guide de la mélodie et du lied, dir. with Gilles Cantagrel (Fayard, 1994) ,
 Robert Schumann (Fayard, 2000). (Grand Prix des Muses, Musicora) , *Schumann
 Clara Schumann (Geneva, Éditions Papillon, 2002) ,
 Robert Schumann (Fayard/Mirare, 2003). Translated into Portuguese ,
 Felix Mendelssohn (Fayard/Mirare, 2003). Translated into Portuguese ,
 Alexandre Pierre François Boëly, with Éric Lebrun (Bleu Nuit Éditeur, 2008) ,
 Felix Mendelssohn, la lumière de son temps (Fayard, 2008). (Prix Catenacci de l’Académie des Beaux-Arts, Institut de France) ,
 La Musique dans l’Allemagne romantique (Fayard, 2009) ,
  De Brahms à Mahler et Strauss. Le postromantisme allemand (Fayard/Mirare, 2010) ,
 Charles-Valentin Alkan, with François Luguenot (Bleu Nuit Éditeur, 2013) ,
 La Musique en France depuis 1870 (Fayard/Mirare, 2013) ,
 Olivier Greif Le Rêve du Monde (with a CD), dir. with Jean-Michel Nectoux (Aedam Musicae, 2013), (Prix des Muses, Singer Polignac, 2014), (Prix de la Critique, 2013/2014) ,
 La Musique au tournant des siècles (Fayard, 2015) ,
 Johannes Brahms – Chemins vers l'Absolu (Fayard, 2018) .

Chapters in 
 150 ans de musique française (Arles, Actes Sud, 1991),
 Le Quatuor à cordes en France (Paris, Association française pour le patrimoine musical, 1995),
 D'un opéra l'autre (Paris, Presses de l'Université de Paris-Sorbonne, 1996),
 Petite Encyclopédie de la Musique (Paris, Réunion des Musées nationaux, 1997),
 Le Conservatoire de Paris, 1795–1995. Deux cents ans de pédagogie (Paris, Buchet-Chastel, 1999).
 Comment devient-on universel ? (L'Harmattan, 2005), *à propos de Mozart
 L'Universel(au) féminin (L'Harmattan, 2006),
 Preface to the reissue of Robert et Clara Schumann, Journal intime, (Buchet-Chastel, 2009) ,
 Académie des Beaux-Arts *Travaux académiques Communications 2009–2010 Chopin à Paris,
 Le Concerto pour piano français à l'épreuve des modernités, (Actes Sud/Palezzo Bru Zane, 2015).

Critical edition of musical works 
 J.-F. Dandrieu (Minkoff, Schola Cantorum, Société française de Musicologie/Heugel),
 A. P. F. Boëly (Choudens, Lemoine, Zurfluh, Bornemann/Leduc, Durand),
 Olivier Greif, Editions Symétrie, Université Paris-Sorbonne *musicologie et Université Lyon 2).

References

External links 
 Association des anciens élèves et élèves des Conservatoire de Paris
  Entretien avec Brigitte François-Sappey sur le site classiquenews.com à propos de sa biographie de Robert Schumann
 Brigitte François-Sappey on Babelio
 Brigitte François-Sappey on Symétrie
 Brigitte François-Sappey on France Culture
 Émission spéciale Olivier Greif avec Brigitte François-Sappey on France Musique
 Franchir les seuils avec Brigitte François-Sappey on ResMusica
 Brigitte François-Sappey on Fondation Ostad Elahi

Writers from Grenoble
1944 births
Living people
20th-century French musicologists
21st-century French musicologists
Women musicologists
French radio producers
French women academics
Conservatoire de Paris alumni
École Normale de Musique de Paris alumni
Paris-Sorbonne University alumni
Academic staff of the Conservatoire de Paris
Academic staff of the University of Lisbon
Officiers of the Ordre des Arts et des Lettres
Chevaliers of the Légion d'honneur
Women music educators
20th-century French women
Women radio producers